Get There is the second studio album by the English rock band Bôa, released in 2005. The album was recording under the independent label that was formed by the four band members called Boa Recordings. During the recording of this album the band consisted of: Alex Caird, Jasmine Rodgers, Steve Rodgers and Lee Sullivan. It is the only Bôa album to date not to feature Ben Henderson and Paul Turrell, who departed the band in 2000 and 2001 respectively. It is distributed worldwide by CD Baby.

Track listing
"Angry" – 3:42 
"Get There" – 4:33
"Wasted" – 3:52 
"Believe Me" – 2:51
"Courage" – 5:08
"A Girl" – 4:40 
"Daylight" – 5:23 
"America" – 4:08
"Older" – 3:17 
"Passport (C.W.B. always with me)" – 5:10
"Standby" – 5:18
"On the Wall" – 3:08

Personnel
 Alex Caird - bass guitar
 Jasmine Rodgers - lead vocals, acoustic guitar, percussion
 Steve Rodgers - electric and acoustic guitar, vocals
 Lee Sullivan - drums, percussion, keyboard

Bôa albums
2005 albums